Take a Bite Outta Rhyme: A Rock Tribute to Rap is a rap rock compilation album that includes covers of well-known hip hop songs by popular rock musicians. The album was released by Republic on October 24, 2000. It includes tracks by Dynamite Hack, Staind, Fun Lovin' Criminals, and others. The album reached number 195 on the Billboard 200 on the week of November 11, 2000.

Track listing

See also
Too Legit for the Pit: Hardcore Takes the Rap: Another compilation that includes rock and hardcore punk covers of hip hop songs.

References

Rap rock compilation albums
Albums produced by Terry Date
2000 compilation albums